Francisco Rolim was a captain-general of Portuguese Cape Verde, from 3 April 1622 until his death a few months later.

References

Colonial heads of Cape Verde
Portuguese colonial governors and administrators
16th-century births
17th-century Portuguese people
1622 deaths